Pierre Fédida (30 October 1934, Lyon – 1 November 2002, Paris) was a French psychoanalyst, who studied under Gilles Deleuze.

References
 Obituary from Le Monde
 
 Dictionary of Psychoanalysis, Publisher: French & European Pubns; 2nd edition 1988, Language: English, 

French psychoanalysts
1934 births
2002 deaths